James William O'Brien (March 2, 1879 – October 7, 1960) was an American farmer and politician.

O'Brien was born in Stillwater, Washington County, Minnesota and was a farmer. He lived in Stillwater, Minnesota and served in the Minnesota House of Representatives from 1943 to 1952.

References

1879 births
1960 deaths
People from Stillwater, Minnesota
Farmers from Minnesota
Members of the Minnesota House of Representatives